Stigmella paradoxa is a moth of the family Nepticulidae. It is found in most of Europe (except the Benelux, Iceland, Denmark, Norway, Norway, Finland, and most of the Baltic region), east to the Near East and the eastern part of the Palearctic realm.

The wingspan is 4–5 mm. The thick erect hairs on the head vertex are rust yellow and the collar white. Antennal eyecapsare white. Forewings are shiny bronze brown  with a tip dark purple brown, apex. Hindwings are brown grey.

Adults are on wing from June to July.

The larvae feed on Crataegus laevigata, Crataegus monogyna and Crataegus pentagyna. They mine the leaves of their host plant. The damage consists of blotch in the tip of a leaf segment, without any preceding corridor.

External links
bladmineerders.nl
Swedish Moths
Fauna Europaea
lepiforum.de

Nepticulidae
Moths of Europe
Moths of Asia
Taxa named by Heinrich Frey
Moths described in 1858